Aleksandr Valeryevich Podymov (born 22 July 1988) is a Russian professional football player. He plays for FC Vityaz Podolsk.

Club career
He made his debut in the Russian Premier League in 2006 for FC Torpedo Moscow.

References

1988 births
Footballers from Moscow
Living people
Russian footballers
FC Torpedo Moscow players
Russian Premier League players
FC Metallurg Lipetsk players
FC Neftekhimik Nizhnekamsk players
FC Sokol Saratov players
FC Khimki players
FC Vityaz Podolsk players
FC Tekstilshchik Ivanovo players
FC Ararat Moscow players
Association football forwards
Association football midfielders